Greatest Hits is a greatest hits compilation from American folk musician Tracy Chapman, released by Elektra/Rhino on November 20, 2015. It is the second compilation of her career and the first available in the United States. All tracks were chosen by Chapman herself. The collection received positive reviews.

Reception
James Christopher Monger of AllMusic gave the album four out of five stars, calling it "a nice mix of hits and deep cuts". In American Songwriter, Hal Horowitz awarded the same score, praising her songwriting and performance but noting, "If there is a downside to Chapman’s music, it’s production that is so consistently clean, if not quite slick, most of the edges are sanded off. It makes this collection flow smoothly, perhaps too much so since a rawer approach would help some of the material connect with more immediacy. Still, for those unfamiliar with her career, this is a top notch, well-chosen summation of Chapman’s classy, emotionally moving catalog." In PopMatters, Chris Gerard's review was seven out of 10 stars, using the opportunity to cover the artist's career and summing up, "This collection is an excellent starting point to discovering that she’s put out a ton of great work."

Track listing
All songs written by Tracy Chapman, except where noted.

"Telling Stories" (from Telling Stories, 2000) – 3:57
"Baby Can I Hold You" (from Tracy Chapman, 1988) – 3:12
"Change" (from Where You Live, 2005) – 5:05
"The Promise" (from New Beginning, 1995) – 5:25
"Open Arms" (from Matters of the Heart, 1992) – 4:34
"Subcity" (from Crossroads, 1989) – 5:10
"Fast Car" (from Tracy Chapman, 1988) – 4:57
"Bang Bang Bang (Song for Little Man)" (from Matters of the Heart, 1992) – 4:22
"Crossroads" (from Crossroads, 1989) – 4:12
"Speak the Word" (from Telling Stories, 2000) – 4:11
"Smoke and Ashes" (from New Beginning, 1995) – 6:39
"Sing for You" (Single Edit, original version from Our Bright Future, 2008) – 3:43
"You're the One" (from Let It Rain, 2002) – 3:05
"Save Us All" (from Our Bright Future, 2008) – 3:45
"All That You Have Is Your Soul" (from Crossroads, 1989) – 5:14
"Talkin' 'Bout a Revolution" (from Tracy Chapman, 1988) – 2:39
"Give Me One Reason" (from New Beginning, 1995) – 4:29
"Stand by Me" (previously unreleased, recorded live at the Late Show with David Letterman, April 16, 2015) (Ben E. King, Jerry Leiber, and Mike Stoller) – 2:49

Certifications

References

External links
Electronic press kit for Greatest Hits
Press release announcing the album

2015 greatest hits albums
Albums produced by David Kershenbaum
Albums produced by Don Gehman
Albums produced by Jimmy Iovine
Albums produced by John Parish
Albums produced by Larry Klein
Albums produced by Tchad Blake
Elektra Records compilation albums
Rhino Records compilation albums
Tracy Chapman compilation albums